Admiral Sir William Domett, GCB (1752 – 19 May 1828) was a senior officer of the British Royal Navy who saw extensive service during the American Revolutionary, French Revolutionary and Napoleonic Wars. Throughout his career, Domett was under the patronage of Alexander Hood, later Lord Bridport. He went on to be First Naval Lord and then Commander-in-Chief, Plymouth during the closing stages of the Napoleonic Wars. Later in life, ill-health forced early retirement and Domett retired to his country estate in Hawkchurch, Devon, close to Lord Bridport's estates.

Early career
Little is known of Domett's birth or upbring, although it is thought he was born in the Hawkchurch, Devon region in 1752. Domett spent the next five and a half years in the Mediterranean Sea, leaving Quebec in 1772 and joining . In 1775, Domett was briefly attached to  before joining  on the Newfoundland Station at the start of the American Revolutionary War.

At the outbreak of the Revolutionary War, Domett was in Surprise when she was at the relief of the Siege of Quebec. As reward for his service in this operations, Admiral John Montagu promoted Domett to lieutenant aboard . Less than a year later, Montagu returned to Britain and brought Domett with him, seconding him to Hood's service. Serving aboard Hood's ship , Domett was in action at the First Battle of Ushant in 1778. He held the rank of lieutenant from 27 December 1778.

Three years later, Domett was still aboard Robust, and in her took part in the Battle of Cape Henry. Following this action, Domett was again taken from his side to be the aide of an admiral, Admiral Sir Samuel Hood. For his services in these actions, Domett became first lieutenant and when, a few months later, Barfleur captured four enemy ships in an action, Domett was given command of the small prize brig Ceres, which he safely brought back to Britain. On his return, Domett was made a post captain.

On board this ship Domett saw out the war, joining Lord Howe's fleet which relieved the Great Siege of Gibraltar and later fought at the Battle of Cape Spartel. The end of the war saw Domett, with many other officers, unemployed and on half-pay.

French Revolutionary and Napoleonic Wars
Domett's close ties with the Hood family meant that he had good connections, and so in 1786, Domett was given the 24-gun  at Leith. On his return, Domett was requested by Admiral Mark Milbanke for service in Newfoundland on  but in 1790 Domett was back in Britain as Hood's captain on  during the Spanish armament.

Royal George was second flagship of the Channel Fleet, and Lord Howe its overall commander. In 1794, Lord Howe embarked on the Atlantic campaign of May 1794, which ended in the Glorious First of June, at which Domett and Royal George were heavily engaged and the ship badly damaged. Domett remained in command when Hood became Viscount Bridport and served under him again the following year at the Battle of Groix. Domett did not leave Royal George until 1800, the seven years he spent in command being a record in the Channel Fleet at the time.

When Lord St Vincent took command of the Channel Fleet, Domett was initially sceptical of his new commander, but the two soon developed a close working partnership and Domett even retained the flag captaincy over the claims of Sir Thomas Troubridge. When St Vincent stepped down a year later, his replacement Admiral Hyde Parker initially transferred Domett to  but later changed his mind and made Domett his flag captain on HMS London for the expedition to Copenhagen.

At the Battle of Copenhagen, Domett disagreed with Parker's tactical plan and persuaded him to change it, resulting in the attack by Nelson at which the Danish fleet was destroyed. Parker did not credit Domett in the dispatch to the Admiralty and Domett was furious, writing an angry letter to Lord Bridport on the matter. When Nelson replaced Parker, he retained Domett again and when he in turn was replaced by Admiral William Cornwallis, Domett was again flag captain, aboard .

Retirement
The Peace of Amiens saw Domett briefly on the Irish station before rejoining Cornwallis at the outbreak of hostilities. On 23 April 1804, Domett was made a rear-admiral but refused a seagoing commission due to a sudden deterioration of his health. Instead, he served as one of the commissioners for revising the civil affairs of the navy. Domett was rapidly promoted during the next eight years but was unable to rejoin the fleet at sea, his health remaining too weak for the strain of such service. Instead, Domett joined the Board of Admiralty in May 1808 and continued to serve in an administrative capacity, his frequent bouts of ill-health making service of any kind difficult. He became First Naval Lord in the Liverpool ministry in March 1812. Promoted to vice-admiral on 25 October 1809, he retired from the Admiralty Board in October 1813 and became Commander-in-Chief, Plymouth but he resigned fifteen months later due to a recurring foot injury which had rendered him lame.

Domett was made a Knight Commander of the Order of the Bath on 2 January 1815, promoted to full admiral on 12 August 1819 and advanced to Knight Grand Cross of the Order of the Bath on 16 May 1820. Domett settled on his estate in Hawkchurch, Devon near the home of Lord Bridport, who had died in 1814. He never married and had no children, but was highly esteemed in the service as a consummate sailor and brave fighter whose extremely long and dedicated sea service had earned him an excellent reputation in the Navy. He died suddenly in 1828 and was buried in the local church.

References

Sources
 
 

|-

1752 births
1828 deaths
Royal Navy admirals
Lords of the Admiralty
Royal Navy personnel of the American Revolutionary War
Royal Navy personnel of the French Revolutionary Wars
Royal Navy personnel of the Napoleonic Wars
Knights Grand Cross of the Order of the Bath